A Lenten supper is a meal that takes place in the evenings to break the day's fast during the Christian liturgical season of Lent, which is widely observed by members of the Catholic, Lutheran, Moravian, Anglican, Methodist, Reformed and United Protestant traditions.

Exercise 
Lenten suppers occur daily from Mondays through Saturdays at sunset during the Lenten season in the context of Christian family life (if that family is observing all forty days of Lent through fasting); in a communal context, they are often held on Wednesdays (though they can be held any day[s] on Monday through Saturday) on which Christians of various denominations often attend a service of worship and then break that day's Lenten fast together through a community Lenten supper. The traditional Black Fast of Lent is kept by not eating during the day and then breaking the fast after sunset; the Eucharistic Fast enjoins fasting before the reception of Holy Communion, with the duration of this fast depending on the denomination.  

Lenten suppers are often held in the church's parish hall in the public setting and in the context of a family meal in the home setting. A Mealtime Prayer is always offered before Christians partake in the Lenten supper. When they are held on Fridays, often following the Stations of the Cross devotion, they often take the form of a fish fry given that many Christians (especially Catholics, Lutherans, Methodists and Anglicans) practice abstinence from meat on Fridays.<ref name="Wesley1825">{{cite book |author1=John Wesley |title=The Sunday Service of the Methodists |date=1825 |publisher=J. Kershaw |page=145 |language=English |quote=Days of Fasting or Abstinence All the Fridays in the Year, except Christmas-Day}}</ref> Given the Lenten focus on sacrifice, abstinence and plainness, Lenten suppers are simple, having foods like vegetarian soup (such as carrot soup), bread and water, with no desserts (as many people practice vegetarianism and teetotalism as a Lenten sacrifice). 

Christians of various traditions, who have voluntarily undertaken the Daniel Fast during the season of Lent, would consume Lenten suppers made from vegetables, fruits, lentils, beans, seeds and nuts, with meat, lacticinia and wine being excluded (cf.'' ). A basket for alms is often kept in the parish hall and Christians who are participating in the Lenten supper contribute to it; these alms are then given to the poor, as almsgiving is one of the three pillars of Lent. In some communities, Lenten suppers are an expression of Christian ecumenism, with Wednesday Lenten services that are followed by Lenten suppers being held at a different denomination's local church each week of Lent (e.g. Catholic, Moravian, Lutheran, Anglican, Methodist and Reformed). Christians have also invited non-Christians to Lenten suppers to allow them to learn more about Christianity and to build bridges with other faith communities.

See also
Christian dietary laws
Lenten daily devotional
Agapefeast

References

Notes

Citations

Christian fasting
Lent